The Aïn Arnat district is an Algerian administrative district in the Sétif province.

Communes 
The District is composed of four communes: El Ouricia, Ain Arnat, Mezloug and Aïn Abessa.

Localisation 

Aïn Arnat District is located in the west of Sétif province and is bordered to the north by the communes:

 commune of Sétif in Sétif District
 commune of Beni Fouda in Djémila District
 commune of Ouled Addouane in Aïn El Kébira District
 commune of Tizi N'Bechar and Amoucha in Amoucha District
 Bejaia Province
 commune of Beni Hocine and Aïn Roua in Bougaa District
 Bordj Bou Arréridj Province
 commune of Guellal in Aïn Oulmane District
 commune of Guidjel and in Guidjel District

References

External links 

Districts of Sétif Province